Buddhadev Das Gupta (1 February 1933 – 15 January 2018) was an Indian classical musician who played the sarod. He used to reside in Kolkata, India. He was one of the artists featured in Nimbus Records' The Raga Guide.

Early life and training
Buddhadev Das Gupta was born on 1 February 1933 in his maternal home at Bhagalpur, India to parents Prafulla Mohan Dasgupta and Bhabani Dasgupta. His father was District Magistrate by profession and an avid lover of music although he never learnt music.

Das Gupta stood second in the Matriculation Examination, held in 1948. He then studied mechanical engineering at the Bengal Engineering and Science University, Shibpur and stood second there, too. Much later in life, on 16 February 2010, the university awarded him an honorary D.Litt. degree.

At a very early age, Buddhadev started taking sarod lessons from the sarod maestro Radhika Mohan Maitra. His first program on the All India Radio was as a guest artist. He eventually performed more than 17 national programs on All India Radio.

Felicitation
In 2011, Das Gupta, was offered the Padma Shri by the government of India, but he turned it down saying "it was far too late in the day". In January 2012, he had been conferred with the Padma Bhushan.
He was awarded Sangeet Natak Akademi Award in 1993 and Sangeet Natak Akademi Tagore Ratna in 2011.

Autobiography
His autobiography Bamaner Chandrasparshavilash (meaning: "The desire of a dwarf to touch the moon"), was periodically published in a Bengali Magazine "Disha" and has been published in the form of book in 2004 (part-I) and in 2010 (part-II).
He is the guru of Bhabanisankar dasgupta, Anirban Dasgupta, Abanindra Maitra, Joydeep Ghosh, Atanu Raksit and others.

Death
Das Gupta died on 15 January 2018 of cardiac arrest at his residence in South Kolkata. He was 84. He had been suffering from respiratory problems for the last few days. At the time of his death, he was survived by wife and two sons. West Bengal Chief Minister Mamata Banerjee said his death has created a void in the field of classical music. "A great loss for the world of classical music. Rest in Peace. Condolences to his family," she said in a tweet.

References

External links

Articles.timesofindia.indiatimes.com
Raga.com
Parabaas.com

1933 births
2018 deaths
Hindustani instrumentalists
Recipients of the Sangeet Natak Akademi Award
Sarod players
University of Calcutta alumni
Recipients of the Padma Bhushan in arts
Musicians from Bihar
Indian male classical musicians
People from Bhagalpur
Musicians from Kolkata
20th-century Indian male musicians
Indian classical musicians of Bengal